Statistics of Emperor's Cup in the 1960 season.

Overview
It was contested by 16 teams, and Furukawa Electric won the championship.

Results

1st Round
Hitachi 3–0 Kyoto Shiko
Nagoya Club 3–2 Dot Well
Toyo Industries 2–1 Kwangaku Club
Motomo Club 0–8 Keio BRB
Meiji University 5–0 Nambu Shukyu-dan
Kwangaku Club 7–0 Toyama Soccer
Yawata Steel 1–0 Osaka Club
Teijin Matsuyama 0–6 Furukawa Electric

Quarterfinals
Hitachi 7–0 Nagoya Club
Toyo Industries 1–2 Keio BRB
Meiji University 1–0 Kwangaku Club
Yawata Steel 0–3 Furukawa Electric

Semifinals
Hitachi 2–2 (lottery) Keio BRB
Meiji University 1–6 Furukawa Electric

Final

Keio BRB 0–4 Furukawa Electric
Furukawa Electric won the championship.

References
 NHK

Emperor's Cup
1960 in Japanese football